The 2012 special election in New Jersey's 10th congressional district was a special election that took place in New Jersey on November 6, 2012, following the death of Democratic member of the United States House of Representatives Donald M. Payne. Payne's son, Donald Payne Jr., won the Democratic Party primary that was held on June 5, 2012. He also won the Democratic primary (held the same day) for the full term beginning in January 2013.

Schedule 
As a matter of convenience and cost saving, this special election was held in conjunction with the regularly scheduled general election on November 6, 2012.  Voters were asked to select two candidates: one to serve the remainder of Payne's term in the 112th Congress, and the other to serve the full 2-year term in the 113th Congress beginning in January 2013.

Candidates

Democratic
The following Democratic candidates ran in the special election primary on June 5, 2012:

 Donald Payne Jr., President of the Newark Municipal Council, member of the Essex County Board of Chosen Freeholders, and son of former U.S. Representative Donald M. Payne
 Ronald C. Rice, member of the Newark Municipal Council
 Wayne Smith, Mayor of Irvington

Republican
No Republicans declared their intent to run in the special election for the unexpired term. Brian Kelemen ran as the Republican candidate for the full term.

Independent
 Joanne Miller, a teacher from Newark and candidate for this seat in 2010

General election

Results

References

External links
Donald Payne Jr. for Congress

10th congressional district
New Jersey 10
United States House of Representatives 2012 10
2012 10 special
New Jersey 2012 10
New Jersey 10